North Odesa Cape, or  Cape E, is a northern point of the Gulf of Odesa. The cape is located on the coast between the villages Lisky and Fontanka of the Odesa Oblast.

External links
 Cape E

Headlands of Ukraine